Chinook Park is a residential neighbourhood in the southwest quadrant of Calgary, Alberta. It is bounded by Glenmore Trail to the north, Elbow Drive to the east, 14 Street W to the west and Heritage Drive to the south.

Chinook Park was established in 1959. It is represented in the Calgary City Council by the Ward 11 councillor.

Demographics

Residents in this community had a median household income of $88,357 in 2000, and there were 9.7% low income residents living in the neighbourhood. As of 2000, 19.8% of the residents were immigrants. A proportion of 18.3% of the buildings were condominiums or apartments, and 17.5% of the housing was used for renting.

Education
The community is served by Chinook Park Bilingual Elementary and Henry Wise Wood High School public schools.

See also
List of neighbourhoods in Calgary

References

External links
Chinook Park - Eagle Ridge - Kelvin Grove Community Association

Neighbourhoods in Calgary